Priya Rajan (born 20 November 1993) of DMK party, is the forty-ninth and the incumbent mayor of Chennai city, Tamil Nadu. She succeeded Saidai Duraisamy of All India Anna Dravida Munnetra Kazhagam to become the third woman mayor of the city after the local body election. She is the youngest woman to be 
the Mayor of Chennai.

Political career
Rajan was elected as a councilor from 74th ward in Thiru. Vi. Ka Nagar in Chennai Corporation. Later she was elected as the 49th mayor of Chennai in 2022.

Personal life
Mayor Priya graduated from Kanyaga Parameswari Women Arts College with a post graduation in Commerce. She is the grand daughter of former two time MLA of Perambur Constituency  Chenghai Sivam.

References

Living people
Mayors of Chennai
Politicians from Chennai
1993 births